Mahanagar Railway Station is a railway station located in Malda district in the Indian state of West Bengal. It serves the village of Mahanagar and the surrounding areas. Mahanagar station was built in 2004. A few trains, like the Gour Express, Malda Town–Balurghat passenger trains stop at Mahanagar railway station.

References

Railway stations in Malda district
Railway stations opened in 2004
Katihar railway division